Miriam Smith is a New Zealand filmmaker. Her films have twice won New Zealand Film Awards, in 2012 and 2017.

Biography 
Smith studied film and English at the University of Auckland, graduating with a master's degree in screenwriting. She later studied at Binger Filmlab in the Netherlands.

Smith is a co-director, with Christopher Pryor, of production company Deer Heart Films. In 2016 Smith and Pryor received the Harriet Friedlander Residency.

Filmography

References 

New Zealand film directors
New Zealand film producers
University of Auckland alumni
Year of birth missing (living people)
Living people